Hanis Zalikha Zainal Rashid (born 9 October 1990) is a Malaysian blogger, model, television presenter and actress. She has also been nominated for the Most Influential Blog Award in 2011.

Early life
She is the second child of seven siblings. Her mother, Nani Rostam was a model in the 1980s. She participated in an online reality television competition, Malaysian Dreamgirl in 2008. She became the second runner up in the competition. In 2010, she was ranked sixth in the Top 10 Fastest Rising People in Google Malaysia Top Searches 2010 chart. Additionally, she was ranked in the top ten in Google Zeitgeist 2011 search.

Education
She received early education at Sekolah Kebangsaan Seri Selangor (1997), Sekolah Kebangsaan USJ 8 (1998) and Sekolah Kebangsaan Seafield (1999–2002). At the secondary level, she attended Sekolah Menengah Kebangsaan USJ 4 (2003), Seafield National High School (2004–2006) and Sekolah Menengah Kebangsaan Seksyen 9 (2007). In 2012, she graduated with a diploma in Business Management from Universiti Teknologi MARA, Segamat, Johor. In addition, she received the Vice Chancellor Award with a Cumulative Grade Average Rating (CGPA) of 3.9. She also intends to pursue her studies at a bachelor's degree level apart from opening her own beauty products business after graduation.

Personal life 
Hanis Zalikha is married to Hairul Azreen in 5 June 2015. She has two children; Yusuf Iskandar born on 3 June 2016, and Alisa Aisyah born on 24 May 2019. They also have a cat, Bujibu Chempel.

Yusuf and Bujibu had a reality show starring the two, titled My Little Heroes — Yusuf & Bujibu. The show ran for eight episodes on Astro Ria and Ria HD in Malaysia.

Filmography

Films

Television series

Television movies

Serial television programmes

Achievements

References

External links

1990 births
People from Kuala Lumpur
Living people
Malaysian people of Malay descent
Malaysian Muslims
Malaysian female models
21st-century Malaysian actresses